The Six Ancient Kilns (六古窯 Rokkoyō) is a category developed by Koyama Fujio (小山富士夫 1900–1975) in the post-war period to describe the most noteworthy ceramic kilns of Japan.

The six kilns are:

 Bizen ware (備前焼, Bizen-yaki), produced in Bizen, Okayama
 Echizen ware (越前焼, Echizen-yaki), produced in Echizen, Odacho and Miyazaki, Fukui Prefecture
 Seto ware (瀬戸焼, Seto-yaki), produced in Seto, Aichi Prefecture
 Shigaraki ware (信楽焼, Shigaraki-yaki), produced in Kōka, Shiga, east of Lake Biwa
 Tamba ware, also known as Tachikui ware (丹波立杭焼, Tamba-Tachikui-yaki), produced in Sasayama and Tachikui in Hyōgo
 Tokoname ware (常滑焼, Tokoname-yaki), produced in Tokoname, Aichi Prefecture

The Okayama Prefectural Bizen Ceramic Museum held an exhibition in 2001 about the six kilns.

See also 
 Enshū's Seven Kilns
 List of Japanese ceramics sites
 Five Great Kilns of Song China

References 
Journey. One thousand years. The Six Ancient Kilns -JAPAN HERITAGE-

External links 
Journey. One thousand years. The Six Ancient Kilns -JAPAN HERITAGE-
The Six Oldest Pottery Centers in Japan
古丹波　その歴史と美 | Old Tamba Pottery Museum
| Six Ancient Kilns of Japan

Japanese pottery
Japanese pottery kiln sites